Graminivora is a monotypic genus of oomycete belonging to the family Peronosporaceae.
It only contains one known species; Graminivora graminicola (Naumov) Thines & Göker

References

Peronosporales
Water mould genera